This is a list of Splendour in the Grass line-ups.

2001-2010

2001 

 Michael Franti and Spearhead (USA)
 Stephen Malkmus and the Jicks (USA)
 Squarepusher (UK)
 Resin Dogs
 Pnau
 28 Days
 Frenzal Rhomb
 Powderfinger
 Something for Kate
 Magic Dirt
 Superheist
 King Kapisi
 Sunk Loto
 george
 Endorphin
 GT
 Couchfunk DJs
 DJ Ransom
 2 Dogs

2002 

 Supergrass (UK)
 Gomez (UK)
 Black Rebel Motorcycle Club (USA)
 Blackalicious (USA)
 Krafty Kuts (UK)
 Doves (UK)
 Bentley Rhythm Ace (UK)
 Jebediah
 Gerling
 george
 sonicanimation
 1200 Techniques
 Grinspoon
 Spiderbait
 Rocket Science
 Machine Gun Fellatio
 Katalyst
 Kid Kenobi
 The Sleepy Jackson
 Resin Dogs
 One Dollar Short
 Bodyjar
 Paul Mac
 Waikiki
 John Butler Trio
 Cut Copy
 Fort
 Rhibosome
 Dan Brodie and the Broken Arrows
 Dexter
 Good Buddha
 Noodles
 Drag
 Kalliope
 Offcutts
 2 Dogs

2003 

 Coldplay (UK)
 Placebo (UK)
 Goldfrapp (UK)
 The Music (UK)
 Veruca Salt (USA)
 Death in Vegas (UK)
 Ugly Duckling (USA)
 Ladytron (UK)
 Adam Freeland (UK)
 Alpinestars (UK)
 Motion Man and KutMasta Kurt (USA)
 Magic Dirt
 The Sleepy Jackson
 Powderfinger
 The Living End
 Jet
 Gerling
 Sarah Blasko
 John Butler Trio
 Downsyde
 The Casanovas
 Decoder Ring
 Ajax
 Katalyst
 Frenzal Rhomb
 Sunk Loto
 1200 Techniques
 The Superjesus
 The Fergusons
 Screamfeeder
 The Mess Hall
 James de la Cruz
 The Bumblebeez
 The Re-Mains
 Goodwill
 Richard Fearless
 Overdub
 Nick Taylor & Jackie Onassid

2004 

 PJ Harvey (UK)
 Jurassic 5 (USA)
 MC5 (USA)
 Franz Ferdinand (UK)
 Dizzee Rascal (UK)
 Snow Patrol (UK)
 Fiery Furnaces (USA)
 Dashboard Confessional (USA)
 Ash (UK)
 Electric Six (USA)
 Ozomatli (USA)
 Money Mark (USA)
 Grinspoon
 Spiderbait
 The Dissociatives
 Xavier Rudd
 Eskimo Joe
 1200 Techniques
 sonicanimation
 Sneaky Sound System
 Hilltop Hoods
 Cut Copy
 Ground Components
 Rocket Science
 Pete Murray
 Infusion
 The Herd
 Katalyst
 James De La Cruz
 Bexta
 Acre
 The Tremors
 Groove Dalley
 Slinky
 Vanlustbader
 DJ Peril

2005 

 Moby (USA)
 Queens of the Stone Age (USA)
 Ryan Adams (USA)
 Interpol (USA)
 Bloc Party (UK)
 Mercury Rev (USA)
 Doves (UK)
 Har Mar Superstar (USA)
 Futureheads (UK)
 Willy Mason (USA)
 Athlete (USA)
 Caribou (CAN)
 Finn Brothers (NZ)
 The Living End
 Scribe (NZ)
 Shihad (NZ)
 Beautiful Girls
 Sarah Blasko
 The Grates
 Cut Copy
 Pnau
 Decoder Ring
 After The Fall
 Katalyst
 Hilltop Hoods
 Gerling
 Butterfingers
 P-Money (NZ)
 Downsyde
 Kid Confucius
 pUss
 Atlantic
 Drag
 DJ Dexter
 Strawberry Syme
 Archie

2006 

 Brian Wilson (USA)
 Sonic Youth (USA)
 Scissor Sisters (USA)
 Death Cab for Cutie (USA)
 DJ Shadow (USA)
 Yeah Yeah Yeahs (USA)
 Snow Patrol (UK)
 José González (SWE)
 TV on the Radio (USA)
 Matisyahu (USA)
 Atmosphere (USA)
 The Zutons (UK)
 Mogwai (UK)
 Mos Def (USA)
 Dungen (SWE)
 Grinspoon
 Wolfmother
 You Am I
 The Vines
 The Presets
 Pete Murray
 The Grates
 Augie March
 Youth Group
 Josh Pyke
 Gerling
 Paul Mac
 Bob Evans
 TZU
 Lior
 Something for Kate
 The Avalanches
 Tex Perkins
 Angus and Julia Stone
 Van She
 Clare Bowditch & The Feeding Set
 Decoder Ring
 The Exploders
 Butterfingers
 The Predators
 Brittle Fex
 N'fa
 Raz Bin Sam & The Lion I Band
 Andrew Morris
 The Love Bus

2007 

 Arctic Monkeys (UK)
 Bloc Party (UK)
 Kaiser Chiefs (UK)
 Lily Allen (UK)
 The Shins (USA)
 Editors (UK)
 Ash (UK)
 Hot Chip (UK)
 The Horrors (UK)
 Ok Go (USA)
 Tilly and the Wall (USA)
 Dirty Three
 Paul Kelly
 The Waifs
 Gotye
 Sarah Blasko
 Powderfinger
 Hoodoo Gurus
 Spiderbait
 Grinspoon
 Sneaky Sound System
 Cut Copy
 Expatriate
 Midnight Juggernauts
 The Cat Empire
 Josh Pyke
 The Beautiful Girls
 The Panics
 Howling Bells
 Muscles
 Holly Throsby
 The Predators
 Hilltop Hoods
 The Herd
 Kisschasy
 Operator Please
 Airbourne
 Blue King Brown
 Planet Asia (USA)
 Magnolia Electric Co (USA)
 Riot in Belgium
 Sara Tindley
 Wild Marmalade
 Lost Valentinos
 Bumblebeez
 Teenager
 Funktrust DJ's
 Old Man River

2008 

 Devo (USA)
 Wolfmother
 Sigur Rós (ISL)
 The Living End
 Polyphonic Spree (USA)
 New Young Pony Club (UK)
 The Presets
 Tricky (UK)
 Vampire Weekend (USA)
 Ben Lee
 Cold War Kids (USA)
 Lyrics Born (USA)
 The Fratellis (UK)
 The Wombats (UK)
 Pnau
 Laura Marling (UK)
 The Vines
 The Grates
 Tokyo Police Club (CAN)
 Albert Hammond Jr. (USA)
 Operator Please
 Band of Horses (USA)
 Van She
 The Panics
 Gyroscope
 MSTRKRFT (CAN)
 Scribe (NZ)
 The Music (UK)
 Robert Forster 
 Clare Bowditch
 Lightspeed Champion (UK)
 Little Red
 Bluejuice
 The Drones
 Hadouken! (UK)
 Bliss N Eso
 Paul Dempsey
 Katalyst
 Even
 British India
 Yves Klein Blue
 Delta Spirit (USA)
 The Galvatrons
 The Gin Club
 Slot Machine (THA)
 The Black Stars
 Van She Tech
 Kato
 Bag Raiders
 ELF. DJ
 Soft Tigers Food Fight
 pob
 DJ Spex

2009 

 The Flaming Lips (USA)
 Bloc Party (UK)
 Happy Mondays (UK)
 MGMT (USA)
 Doves (UK)
 The Specials (UK)
 Friendly Fires (UK)
 White Lies (UK)
 The Gutter Twins (USA)
 Manchester Orchestra (USA)
 Yuksek (FRA)
 Dananananaykroyd (UK)
 Grinspoon
 Hilltop Hoods
 Sarah Blasko 
 Augie March
 Midnight Juggernauts
 Architecture in Helsinki
 The Living End
 Josh Pyke
 Little Birdy
 The Beautiful Girls
 Downsyde & Drapht
 Decoder Ring
 Kisschasy
 Children Collide
 Bluejuice
 Little Red
 Dappled Cities
 Paul Dempsey
 Yves Klein Blue
 The Middle East
 Birds of Tokyo
 Lost Valentinos
 Bob Evans
 You Am I
 Kram
 Bridezilla
 Holly Throsby
 Miami Horror
 Art vs. Science
 Leader Cheetah
 Glass Towers
 Cut Copy DJ's
 Deya Dova
 Jack Ladder
 Polaroid Fame
 Yacht Club DJs
 Canyons
 Jack Shit
 Daniel Webber
 Pablo Calamari & Shivers
 Raz Bin Sam & DJ Wade
 Oshi One
 Dee Dee
 Double Vision
 Strange Planet
 Dave C
 Nick Taylor
 Kaliba
 Gravy
 Zenna
 Si Clone
 Dark Nebula
 Slinky
 Pob
 Deegs
 Captain Kaine
 Tommi Gunn
 Ruff Dimond
 Sista Ray
 DJ Spex

2010 

 The Strokes (USA)
 Pixies (USA)
 Ben Harper (USA)
 Florence and the Machine (UK)
 Mumford & Sons (UK)
 Goldfrapp (UK)
 Scissor Sisters (USA)
 LCD Soundsystem (USA)
 Grizzly Bear (USA)
 Foals (UK)
 Hot Chip (UK)
 Passion Pit (USA)
 Laura Marling (UK)
 Kate Nash (UK)
 Yeasayer (USA)
 Band of Horses (USA)
 Broken Social Scene (CAN)
 Band of Skulls (UK)
 Surfer Blood (USA)
 The Drums (USA)
 Jónsi (ISL)
 Ash (UK)
 We Are Scientists (USA)
 K-Os (CAN)
 Black Rebel Motorcycle Club (USA)
 Two Door Cinema Club (IRL)
 Richard Ashcroft & The United Nations of Sound (UK)
 Alberta Cross (UK)
 Fanfarlo (UK)
 Midlake (USA)
 Delphic (UK)
 School of Seven Bells (USA)
 The Magic Numbers (UK)
 Frightened Rabbit (UK)
 Angus and Julia Stone
 Empire of the Sun
 The Temper Trap
 Art vs. Science
 Wolfmother
 The Vines
 Tame Impala
 Paul Kelly
 Operator Please
 Lisa Mitchell
 Midnight Juggernauts
 Little Red
 Space Invadas
 British India
 Miami Horror
 The Middle East
 Bluejuice
 Clare Bowditch
 Philadelphia Grand Jury
 The Mess Hall
 Violent Soho
 Horrorshow
 Washington
 Yacht Club DJs
 Whitley
 Dan Sultan
 Cloud Control
 Jinja Safari
 Oh Mercy
 John Steel Singers
 Jonathan Boulet
 Boy & Bear
 Gypsy and the Cat
 Ernest Ellis
 Pensioner
 Last Dinosaurs
 Tim and Jean
 RVLR
 DJ Spex and MC Hernan

2011-present

2011 

 Coldplay (UK)
 Kanye West (USA)
 Jane's Addiction (USA)
 The Hives (SWE)
 Pulp (UK)
 The Living End
 The Mars Volta (USA)
 Regina Spektor (USA)
 Bliss n Eso 
 Mogwai (UK)
 DJ Shadow (USA)
 Friendly Fires (UK)
 Glasvegas (UK)
 Devendra Banhart and The Grogs (USA)
 Modest Mouse (USA)
 The Middle East
 Kaiser Chiefs (UK)
 James Blake (UK)
 Kele (UK)
 The Vines
 Elbow (UK)
 Eskimo Joe
 Noah and the Whale (UK)
 Children Collide
 Thievery Corporation (USA)
 Cut Copy
 Isobel Campbell and Mark Lanegan (UK/USA)
 Bluejuice
 The Kills (USA)
 Black Joe Lewis & the Honeybears ft. The Relatives (USA)
 Architecture in Helsinki
 Foster the People (USA)
 The Panics
 Jebediah
 The Vaccines (UK)
 Gomez (UK)
 Boy & Bear
 Gotye
 Does It Offend You, Yeah? (UK)
 Cloud Control
 Mona (USA)
 Sparkadia
 Warpaint
 Muscles Live
 Fitz and the Tantrums (USA)
 The Jezabels 
 Drapht
 British Sea Power (UK)
 Tim & Jean
 Leader Cheetah
 Grouplove (USA)
 Seeker Lover Keeper
 Yelle (FRA)
 Kimbra (NZ)
 Phrase
 Oh Mercy
 Dananananaykroyd (UK)
 The Black Seeds (NZ)
 Marques Toliver (USA)
 The Holidays
 Ghoul
 Liam Finn (NZ)
 The Herd
 Young the Giant (USA)
 Guineafowl
 Hungry Kids of Hungary
 Jinja Safari
 Wild Beasts (UK)
 Illy
 Cut Off Your Hands (NZ)
 Gareth Liddiard
 Alpine
 World's End Press
 Mosman Adler
 Lanie Lane
 The Aston Shuffle
 Flight Facilities
 D-Cup
 Ajax
 Wax Motif
 DJ Spex and MC Hernan
 Triple J Unearthed winners

2012 

 Jack White (USA)
 Bloc Party (UK)
 The Smashing Pumpkins (USA)
 At the Drive-In (USA)
 The Shins (USA)
 Hilltop Hoods
 The Kooks (UK)
 Miike Snow (SWE)
 Gossip (USA)
 Dirty Three
 Lana Del Rey (USA)
 360
 Azealia Banks (USA)
 Tame Impala
 Explosions in the Sky (USA)
 Band of Skulls (UK)
 Ladyhawke (NZ)
 The Afghan Whigs (USA)
 Missy Higgins
 Wolfmother
 Metric (CAN)
 Kimbra (NZ)
 Mudhoney (USA)
 50 Years of Dylan
 Spiderbait
 Django Django (UK)
 Gypsy & The Cat
 San Cisco
 Last Dinosaurs
 Electric Guest (USA)
 Muscles
 Angus Stone
 DZ Deathrays
 Howler (USA)
 Lanie Lane
 Fun. (USA)
 Big Scary
 Michael Kiwanuka (UK)
 Seekae
 Friends (USA)
 Yacht Club DJ's
 Bertie Blackman
 Jinja Safari
 Blue King Brown
 Youth Lagoon (USA)
 Pond
 The Beautiful Girls
 Yuksek (FRA)
 Tijuana Cartel
 Ball Park Music
 The Rubens
 Ben Howard (UK)
 Bleeding Knees Club
 Zulu Winter (UK)
 The Medics
 Shihad (NZ)
 Hypnotic Brass Ensemble (USA)
 Husky
 Kate Miller-Heidke
 Father John Misty (USA)
 Emma Louise
 Chet Faker
 Here We Go Magic (USA)
 Parachute Youth
 Mosman Alder
 The Cast of Cheers (IRL)
 Wolf & Cub
 Gossling
 Beni
 Sampology AV/DJ Show
 Canyons DJ Set
 Nina Las Vegas
 Danny T
 Alison Wonderland
 Luke Million
 Nice and Ego AV/DJ Show
 Flume
 Gloves
 Harris Robotis
 Alley Oop
 DJ Spex
 Triple J Unearthed winners

2013 

 Mumford & Sons (UK)
 The National (USA)
 Frank Ocean (USA)
 Lorde (NZ) 
 Of Monsters and Men (ISL)
 Empire of the Sun
 Bernard Fanning
 The Presets
 TV on the Radio (USA)
 Klaxons (UK)
 Flume
 Babyshambles (UK)
 Passion Pit (USA)
 Birds of Tokyo
 James Blake (UK)
 Architecture in Helsinki
 Laura Marling (UK)
 Matt Corby
 Drapht
 Alt-J (UK)
 Flight Facilities
 Polyphonic Spree (USA)
 Boy & Bear
 Fat Freddy's Drop (NZ)
 Cold War Kids (USA)
 The Rubens
 Sarah Blasko
 Darwin Deez (USA)
 You Am I
 Hermitude
 Haim (USA)
 Airbourne
 The Drones
 MS MR (USA)
 Gurrumul
 Everything Everything (UK)
 Clairy Browne & the Bangin' Rockettes
 Cloud Control
 Portugal. The Man (USA)
 Daughter (UK)
 Something for Kate
 Wavves (USA)
 Chet Faker
 Snakadaktal
 Robert Delong (USA)
 Unknown Mortal Orchestra (NZ)
 Whitley
 Fidlar (USA)
 Jake Bugg (UK)
 The Bamboos
 Surfer Blood (USA)
 Deap Valley (USA)
 Palma Violets (UK)
 Alpine
 Little Green Cars (IRL)
 Vance Joy
 Jagwar Ma
 Villagers (IRL)
 Violent Soho
 Dune Rats
 PVT
 The Jungle Giants
 Cub Scouts
 Art of Sleeping
 The Growl
 Twinsy
 The Chemist
 Songs
 Mitzi
 Triple J Unearthed Winners
 Alison Wonderland
 Yolanda Be Cool
 What So Not
 Xaphoon Jones (USA)
 DCUP
 Otologic
 Peking Duk
 Tyler Touche
 Bad Ezzy
 DJ Spex

 Lorde replaced Frank Ocean, who withdrew from the lineup due to health issues

2014 

 Outkast (USA) 
 Two Door Cinema Club (UK) 
 Foals (UK)
 Lily Allen (UK)
 Interpol (USA) 
 Foster the People (USA)
 Childish Gambino (USA)
 Hilltop Hoods
 Angus & Julia Stone
 City and Colour (CAN)
 London Grammar (UK)
 The Presets
 Vance Joy
 Darkside (USA)
 RÜFÜS
 Ben Howard (UK)
 Kelis (USA)
 Metronomy (UK)
 Hoodoo Gurus
 Chvrches (UK) 
 Grouplove (USA)
 The Jezabels
 Tune-Yards (USA)
 360
 Wild Beasts (UK)
 Danny Brown (USA) 
 Illy
 First Aid Kit (SWE)
 Violent Soho
 Ásgeir (ISL)
 Spiderbait
 The 1975 (UK)
 Ball Park Music
 Art vs Science
 Sam Smith (UK)
 Buraka Som Sistema (PRT)
 The Preatures
 Parquet Courts (USA)
 Sticky Fingers
 Peking Duk
 Sky Ferreira (USA)
 Future Islands (USA)
 Courtney Barnett
 Phantogram (USA)
 DZ Deathrays
 Skaters (USA)
 Gossling
 Jungle (UK)
 The Strypes (IRL)
 Hot Dub Time Machine
 The Kite String Tangle
 RY X
 Mikhael Paskalev (NOR)
 Wave Racer
 The Acid (USA/UK/AUS)
 Saskwatch
 Kingswood
 Circa Waves (UK)
 Broods (NZ)
 Dustin Tebbutt
 The Head and the Heart (USA)
 DMA's
 Darren Middleton
 Little May
 Darlia (UK)
 D.D Dumbo
 Tkay Maidza
 The Creases
 The Wild Feathers (USA)
 Chrome Sparks (USA)
 Fractures
 Mas Ysa (CAN)
 Nick Mulvey (UK)
 Triple J Unearthed winners
 Nina Las Vegas
 Yacht Club DJs
 Motez
 Touch Sensitive
 Indian Summer
 Wordlife
 L D R U & Yahtzel DJs
 Cosmo's Midnight
 Sable
 Kilter
 Basenji
 KLP (musician)
 Fishing DJs
 Paces
 Charles Murdoch
 DJ Spex

 Two Door Cinema Club withdrew from the lineup and were replaced by UK outfit Foals.
 London Grammar withdrew from the lineup due to illness and were replaced by The Presets.

2015 

 Blur (UK)
 Florence and the Machine (UK)
 Mark Ronson (UK)
 Of Monsters and Men (IS)
 The Wombats (UK)
 Tame Impala
 Peking Duk
 Ryan Adams (USA)
 Flight Facilities
 Royal Blood (UK) 
 Death Cab for Cutie (USA)
 Earl Sweatshirt (USA)
 Boy & Bear
 Porter Robinson (USA) Live
 The Dandy Warhols (USA) 
 Xavier Rudd & The United Nations
 Azealia Banks (USA)
 The Rubens
 Jamie T (UK)
 Pond
 Spiritualized (UK) 
 Alison Wonderland
 Thundamentals
 Best Coast (USA)
 Everything Everything (UK)
 San Cisco
 MS MR (USA)
 Jarryd James
 Purity Ring (CAN)
 Allday
 Carmada
 The Grates
 The Smith Street Band
 Tkay Maidza
 Johnny Marr (UK)
 Last Dinosaurs
 Megan Washington
 The Vaccines (UK)
 #1 Dads
 The Church
 Kitty, Daisy & Lewis (UK)
 The King Khan & BBQ Show (CAN)
 Alpine
 Catfish and the Bottlemen (UK)
 DZ Deathrays
 Paul Mac
 Dustin Tebbutt
 MØ (DNK)
 Years & Years (UK)
 Jenny Lewis (USA)
 C.W. Stoneking
 Seekae
 George Maple
 Elliphant (SWE)
 Client Liaison
 Palma Violets (UK)
 Safia
 Hayden James
 Dune Rats
 Wolf Alice
 Meg Mac
 Cosmo's Midnight
 Marmozets (UK)
 Oh Mercy
 Mansionair
 The Districts (USA)
 Shlohmo (USA)
 Elizabeth Rose
 The Delta Riggs
 Circa Waves (UK)
 Nancy Whang (USA)
 Eves the Behavior
 Urban Cone (SWE)
 Art of Sleeping
 Japanese Wallpaper
 Gengahr (UK)
 Bad//Dreems
 Ecca Vandal
 Holy Holy
 Vallis Alps
 UV boi فوق بنفسجي
 The Babe Rainbow
 Harts
 Generik
 Young Franco
 Mickey Kojack
 GL
 Benson
 Harvey Sutherland
 Total Giovanni
 Dugong Jr
 I'lls
 Akouo
 Noise In My Head
 Triple J Unearthed winners
 Joyride
 Post Percy
 Ara Koufax
 CC:Disco!
 Adi Toohey
 Set Mo
 Edd Fisher
 Mike Who
 Shantan Wantan Ichiban

 Catfish And The Bottlemen withdrew from the lineup just two days from the festival's start due to illness and were replaced with DZ Deathrays.
 Allday withdrew from the lineup just hours before he was scheduled to perform due to a family emergency.

2016 

 Friday, 22 July

 Saturday, 23 July

 Sunday, 24 July

2017 

 Friday, 21 July

 Saturday, 22 July

 Sunday, 23 July

 George Ezra who was originally scheduled for Friday the 21st withdrew from the lineup, moving Peking Duk to the Friday and extending both LCD Soundsystem's & Sigur Ros' set times on Sunday the 23rd

2018 

 Friday, July 20

 Saturday, July 21

 Sunday, July 22

 Chromeo withdrew from the lineup due to health issues and were replaced with The Presets.

2019 

 Chance the Rapper (USA)
 Hilltop Hoods
 Tame Impala
 Childish Gambino (USA)
 SZA (USA)
 Foals (UK)
 Catfish and the Bottlemen (UK)
 James Blake (UK)
 Santigold (USA)
 The Lumineers (USA)
 The Streets (UK)
 Russ (USA)
 What So Not
 Courtney Barnett
 Warpaint (USA)
 Ocean Alley
 Matt Corby
 Wolf Alice (UK)
 Friendly Fires (UK)
 Broods (NZ)
 Dean Lewis
 Fidlar (USA)
 Cosmo's Midnight
 Meg Mac
 Ziggy Alberts
 Hayden James
 Dave (UK)
 Dope Lemon
 Dermot Kennedy (IRL)
 Allday and Friends
 Little Simz (UK)
 The Rubens
 Maribou State (UK)
 Winston Surfshirt
 Tycho (USA)
 Pond
 The Teskey Brothers
 Jacob Banks (UK)
 Wolfmother
 Tropical Fuck Storm
 Kyle Hall (USA)
 Local Natives (USA)
 Mansionair
 Odette 
 Ruby Fields
 Mike Servito (USA)
 Last Dinosaurs
 Thelma Plum
 Trophy Eyes
 Harvey Sutherland DJ Set
 K.Flay (USA)
 Sam Fender (UK)
 Slaves (UK)
 Pub Choir
 Seb Wildblood (UK)
 The Beths (NZ)
 Set Mo
 Hatchie
 Honne (UK)
 Kwame
 The Nude Party (USA)
 Nathan Micay (GER)
 Slowly Slowly
 Psychedelic Porn Crumpets
 Kian
 Kenji Takimi (JPN)
 Dear Seattle
 Charly Bliss (USA)
 Kaiit
 Phony Ppl (USA)
 A.Swayze and the Ghosts
 The Midnight (USA)
 Channel Tres (USA)
 Pist Idiots
 MorMor (CAN)
 Spacey Jane
 Suzanne Kraft (USA)
 Erthlings
 Telephones (NOR)
 Moaning Lisa
 Thandi Phoenix
 DJ Jnett
 Wax'o Paradiso
 Andy Garvey
 Tyne-James Organ
 Lastlings
 Merve
 Jennifer Loveless
 Noise In My Head
 Skin On Skin
 Rebel Yell
 Triple J Unearthed Friday
 Triple J Unearthed Saturday
 Ninajirachi
 Body Promise
 Donald's House
 Casual Connection
 DJ Klasik
 Close Counters DJ Set
 Merph
 Dameeeela
 Lex Deluxe

 Chance the Rapper withdrew from the lineup the day before he was scheduled to perform due to illness. He was replaced by Hilltop Hoods.
 MorMor withdrew from the lineup due to unspecified reasons. He was replaced with Spacey Jane.

2022
The 20th anniversary edition of the festival was originally scheduled for 24–26 July 2020, however due to the COVID-19 pandemic it was rescheduled several times; first to 23–25 October that same year, then to 23–25 July 2021, then to 19–21 November 2021, and again to 22–24 July 2022.

On 13 July 2020 the organisers announced that Gorillaz would be replacing Flume as the headliner for the Friday night, while The Strokes and Tyler, The Creator would be appearing as previously scheduled.

On 1 December 2021 the line-up for the 2022 edition of the festival was released.

Note: Artists in italics were not originally announced for the 2020 edition of the festival.

22 July 2022

 Gorillaz (UK)
 The Avalanches
 Yeah Yeah Yeahs (USA)
 Kacey Musgraves (USA)
 DMA's
 Dillon Francis (USA)
 YUNGBLUD (UK)
 Ruel
 Jungle (UK)
 Orville Peck (CAN)
 Cub Sport
 Sofi Tukker (USA)
 Baker Boy
 Still Woozy (USA)
 Hooligan Hefs
 Joy Crookes (UK)
 Confidence Man
 Maxo Kream (USA)
 Rolling Blackouts Coastal Fever
 Wet Leg (UK)
 Miiesha
 Sly Withers
 Starcrawler (USA)
 Mako Road (NZ)
 Renforshort (CAN)
 MAY-A
 Flowerkid
 Fazerdaze (NZ)
 George Alice
 The Buoys
 1300
 Dena Amy
 Luen
 Aywy

23 July 2022

 The Strokes (USA)
 Glass Animals (UK)
 Violent Soho
 Tim Minchin
 Jack Harlow (USA)
 The Jungle Giants
 Oliver Tree (USA)
 Tom Misch (UK)
 Cosmo's Midnight
 Ruby Fields
 JPEGMafia (USA)
 Methyl Ethel
 Stella Donnelly
 The Chats
 Biig Piig (IRL)
 Chillinit
 Triple One
 PUP (CAN)
 Tai Verdes (USA)
 Myd DJ Set (FRA)
 Hinds (SPA)
 Noah Dillon
 Alice Ivy
 Budjerah
 Mildlife
 Jarreau Vandal (NL)
 Brame & Hamo (IRL)
 Adrian Eagle
 Tasman Keith
 The Lazy Eyes
 Banoffee
 Moktar
 Stevan
 Dro Carey & DJ Scorpion
 PRICIE
 Pink Matter
 Memphis LK DJ Set
 Jordan Brando
 Honey Point
 Carolina Gasolina

24 July 2022

 Tyler, The Creator (USA)
 Liam Gallagher (UK)
 Duke Dumont  (UK)
 Mura Masa (UK)
 Amyl and the Sniffers
 Aitch (UK)
 G Flip
 Grinspoon
 Parquet Courts (USA)
 Tierra Whack (USA)
 Julia Stone
 Pond
 Genesis Owusu
 Surfaces (USA)
 Holly Humberstone (UK)
 Alex the Astronaut
 Bad//Dreems
 Northeast Party House
 Mo'Ju
 Shannon & the Clams (USA)
 Babe Rainbow
 The Snuts (UK)
 Sycco
 Dayglow (USA)
 JK-47
 JEFF the Brotherhood (USA)
 Big Twisty & The Funknasty
 The Soul Movers
 King Stingray
 Mylee Grace
 Tom Cardy
 Mickey Kojack
 Andy Golledge
 Charlie Collins
 Shantan Wantan Ichiban
 AK Sports
 Munasib

 Tom Cardy withdrew from the lineup due to personal issues and was replaced by Big Twisty & The Funknasty
 Surfaces, Mako Road, and Adrian Eagle withdrew from the lineup and were replaced by Pond and Tasman Keith
 Yeah Yeah Yeahs withdrew from the lineup due to illness and were replaced by The Avalanches
 Tom Misch and Hinds withdrew from the lineup two days before the festival's start and were replaced by Cosmo's Midnight and Noah dillon

The following artists were originally announced as part of the line-up for the 2020 edition of the festival, but were not included in the 2022 line-up:

24 July 2020

 Flume
 Midnight Oil
 King Krule (UK)
 Petit Biscuit (FRA)
 Illy
 Julia Jacklin
 Wallows (USA)
 Bruno Major (UK)
 Inhaler (IRL)
 Gryffin (USA)
 Muna (USA)
 100
 Miss June (NZ)

25 July 2020

 Dom Dolla
 King Princess (USA)
 Thelma Plum
 Mall Grab
 Grouplove (USA)
 Kllo
 Shaed (USA)
 The Big Moon (UK)
 Greentea Peng (UK)
 Lex Deluxe

26 July 2020

 Denzel Curry (USA)
 Idles (UK)
 Sampa the Great
 Gerry Cinnamon (UK)
 Jack Garratt (UK)
 Lime Cordiale
 Jack River
 Benee (NZ)
 Georgia (UK)
 Cry Club
 Sauti Systems
 Lillie Mae (USA)

References 

Music festivals in Australia
Splendour in the Grass